Rhodelia is a rural unincorporated community in Meade County, Kentucky, United States.  It is a small  community that lies a few miles west of Brandenburg on KY 144 near its intersection with Rhodes Road and south of KY 144's intersection with KY 259.

History
A post office called Rhodelia was established in 1879. The community was named for Elias Rhodes, a pioneer settler.

Near Rhodelia is St. Theresa Roman Catholic Church, listed on the National Register of Historic Places.

References

Unincorporated communities in Meade County, Kentucky
Louisville metropolitan area
Unincorporated communities in Kentucky